Bill Draut (August 14, 1921–March 3, 1993) was an American comic book artist best known for his work at Harvey Comics and DC Comics from the 1940s to the 1970s.

Biography
Bill Draut began his career as an artist in the 1940s by drawing the "Sergeant Stony Craig" comic strip for the Bell Syndicate. After service in the United States Marine Corps during World War II, he then moved into the comic book industry with his earliest confirmed credit appearing in Harvey Comics' Stuntman Comics #1 (April–May 1946). He worked with Joe Simon and Jack Kirby at Crestwood Publications.

In 1956, Draut began drawing romance stories for DC Comics. He later did extensive work on that publisher's mystery titles including House of Mystery, House of Secrets, The Unexpected, and Weird War Tales. In 1966, Draut co-created Bee-Man with writer Otto Binder for Harvey Comics' Double-Dare Adventures. Draut drew Teen Titans #18 (Nov.–Dec. 1968) which was writer Marv Wolfman's first Teen Titans story and introduced the character originally called Starfire and later renamed Red Star. Draut inked the revival of the Phantom Stranger in Showcase #80 (Feb. 1969) and then drew the first four issues of the Phantom Stranger ongoing series. He and Mark Hanerfeld created Abel in DC Special #4 (July–Sept. 1969) and the character soon became the "host" of the House of Secrets series. Draut was to have drawn the first appearance of Marvel Comics' Scarecrow character but did not complete the assignment. He was a character designer on the G.I. Joe: A Real American Hero animated series for Sunbow Entertainment. Draut's final published work in comics was inking Steve Ditko's pencilled artwork in the story "Who Is The Monster?" in The Fly #3 (Oct. 1983).

Bibliography

Archie Comics
 Adventures of the Fly #1 (1959)
 The Fly #3 (1983)

Charlton Comics
 Cody of the Pony Express #8 (1955) 
 Crazy, Man, Crazy #v2#2 (1956)
 Fox Hole #5–6 (1955)
 From Here to Insanity #11 (1955)
 In Love #6 (1955)
 Police Trap #5 (1955)

Crestwood Publications/Prize Comics
 All for Love #1 (1957)
 Black Magic #1–4, 6–7, 9, 12–15, 17, 20–24, 32 (1950–1954)
 Headline Comics #27–31, 74–77 (1947–1956)
 Strange World of Your Dreams #1, 3 (1952)
 Young Brides #1 (1952)
 Young Love #1 (1949)
 Young Romance #1 (1947)

DC Comics

 DC Special #4 (13 Shock-Ending Stories) (1969)
 DC Special Series #12 (Secrets of Haunted House Special) (1978)
 Falling in Love #8, 10–11, 17, 25–26, 29, 31, 33, 37–38, 48–50, 52–54, 65, 67, 82–83 (1956–1966)
 The Flash #237 (Green Lantern backup story) (1975)
 Forbidden Tales of Dark Mansion #7, 12 (1972–1973)
 Ghosts #62, 71, 75–76, 78, 83 (1978–1979)
 G.I. Combat #213 (1979)
 Girls' Love Stories #49, 51, 59, 64, 66, 69, 73, 79, 83, 86, 89, 91, 98, 100, 122, 142, 147, 149–150, 154, 156–157, 162 (1957–1971)
 Girls' Romances #44, 48, 53, 60, 64–67, 69, 71, 74, 81, 85–87, 90, 95 (1957–1963)
 Heart Throbs #47 (1957)
 House of Mystery #177, 191, 193, 251–255, 257, 265, 273 (1968–1979)
 House of Secrets #81, 83, 86, 88, 92, 96, 127–128, 133, 139, 141–143, 146–147, 149 (1969–1978)
 Kong the Untamed #5 (1976)
 Leave It to Binky #71 (1970)
 Phantom Stranger vol. 2 #1–4, 32 (1969–1974)
 Plop! #3, 6, 15, 19 (1974–1976)
 Secret Hearts #38, 40, 45–46, 56, 58, 104, 145 (1957–1970)
 Secrets of Haunted House #2, 5 (1975–1976)
 Secrets of Sinister House #6, 14 (1972–1973)
 Sgt. Rock #305 (1977)
 Showcase #80 (Phantom Stranger); #104 (O.S.S. Spies at War) (1969–1978)
 Star Spangled War Stories #195 (1976)
 Superboy starring the Legion of Super-Heroes #213–215 (1975–1976)
 The Superman Family #184 (1977)
 Super-Team Family #2, 12 (1975–1977)
 Tales of Ghost Castle #3 (1975)
 Tales of the Unexpected #2 (1956)
 Teen Titans #18 (1968)
 The Unexpected #109–111, 140, 146, 162, 189, 190 (1968–1979)
 Unknown Soldier #217 (1978)
 Weird Mystery Tales #4, 22 (1973–1975)
 Weird War Tales #30–32, 36, 39–40, 43, 48–49, 51, 55–58, 69 (1974–1978)
 Weird Western Tales #15, 36 (1972–1976)
 Welcome Back, Kotter #6–7 (1977)
 The Witching Hour #7, 83 (1970–1978)
 Young Love #125–126 (1977)
 Young Romance #125, 156 (1963–1968)

Marvel Comics
 Journey into Mystery #40 (1956)
 Spellbound #29 (1956)
 Strange Stories of Suspense #11 (1956)
 Western Outlaws #16 (1956)

References

External links
 
 Bill Draut at Mike's Amazing World of Comics

1921 births
1993 deaths
20th-century American artists
American animators
American comics artists
United States Marine Corps personnel of World War II
Comics inkers
DC Comics people
Golden Age comics creators
Silver Age comics creators
United States Marines
Marvel Comics people